Battus philenor hirsuta, the California pipevine swallowtail or hairy pipevine swallowtail, is a subspecies of the pipevine swallowtail that is endemic to Northern California in the United States. The butterfly is black with hindwings that have iridescent green-blue coloring above and a row of red spots below; the caterpillars are black with fleshy protrusions and orange spots. The subspecies' butterflies are smaller in size and hairier than the species, and they lay eggs in larger clutch sizes than the species. The egg clutches are deposited on the shoot tips of the California pipevine, a perennial vine native to riparian, chaparral, and woodland ecosystems of the California Coast Ranges, Sacramento Valley, and Sierra Nevada foothills. The larvae feed exclusively on the foliage and shoot tips of the pipevine, although adults eat floral nectar from a variety of plants. The plant contains a toxic substance, aristolochic acid. The larvae sequester the toxin, and both the juvenile and adult butterflies have high and toxic concentrations of the aristolochic acid in their tissues. Throughout the range of the species, Battus philenor, other butterflies and moths mimic the distinctive coloration of the swallowtail to avoid predators. However, there are no known mimics of the Californian subspecies.

Distribution and habitat 
Populations of the California pipevine swallowtail are found throughout the Sacramento Valley and outside of the valley in Contra Costa and Alameda counties. These populations are isolated from other pipevine swallowtail populations, making it a separate subspecies.

Return to San Francisco
The species' presence was drastically reduced in San Francisco, but was being brought back as of 2017, through efforts mainly attributed to Tim Wong, an aquatic biologist at the California Academy of Sciences. He gathered caterpillars from nearby areas and raised them in his backyard. He also used the butterflies he raised to repopulate the San Francisco Botanical Garden.

References

philenor
Butterflies of North America
Endemic fauna of California
Fauna of the California chaparral and woodlands
Fauna of the San Francisco Bay Area
Natural history of the Central Valley (California)
~
Butterfly subspecies